McEveety is a surname. Notable people with the surname include:

Bernard McEveety (1924–2004), American director
Stephen McEveety (born 1954), American film producer
Vincent McEveety (1929–2018), American film and television director